Middle or The Middle may refer to:
 Centre (geometry), the point equally distant from the outer limits.

Places
 Middle (sheading), a subdivision of the Isle of Man
 Middle Bay (disambiguation)
 Middle Brook (disambiguation)
 Middle Creek (disambiguation)
 Middle Island (disambiguation)
 Middle Lake (disambiguation)
 Middle Mountain, California
 Middle Peninsula, Chesapeake Bay, Virginia
 Middle Range, a former name of the Xueshan Range on Taiwan Island
 Middle River (disambiguation)
 Middle Rocks, two rocks at the eastern opening of the Straits of Singapore
 Middle Sound, a bay in North Carolina
 Middle Township (disambiguation)
 Middle East

Music
"Middle" (song), 2015
"The Middle" (Jimmy Eat World song), 2001
"The Middle" (Zedd, Maren Morris and Grey song), 2018
"Middle", a song by Rocket from the Crypt from their 1995 album Scream, Dracula, Scream!
"The Middle", a song by Demi Lovato from their debut album Don't Forget
"The Middle", a song by The Doubleclicks from their album President Snakes
"The Middle", a song by Lauren Alaina from her album Wildflower
"The Middle", a song by Trampled by Turtles from their album Life Is Good on the Open Road

Other uses
The Middle (TV series)
Middle Road (disambiguation)
Middle school, an educational stage in some countries

See also
 
 Center (disambiguation)
 Core (disambiguation)
 Seed